Elections to the Upper House of the Althing were held in Iceland on 8 July 1922. Following reforms in 1915, the six seats in the Upper House appointed by the monarch were abolished, and replaced with six elected seats. The seats were elected by proportional representation at the national level, using the D'Hondt method. The remaining eight seats were elected along with the Lower House.

Results

References

Elections in Iceland
Iceland
Parliament
Iceland